The Confederation of African Athletics (CAA; French: Confédération Africaine d'Athlétisme) is the continental association for the sport of athletics in Africa. It is headquartered in Dakar, Senegal. It organises the African Championships in Athletics and other continental competitions. The body's current president is Hamad Kalkaba Malboum of Cameroon.

Member federations

See also

 List of African records in athletics

External links
 CAA official website

Athletics organizations
Ath